Cyclone is a pinball machine released by Williams Electronics in 1988. It features an amusement park theme, Coney Island, and was advertised with the slogan "It'll blow you away!".  Ronald Reagan and Nancy Reagan both appear in the backglass shown riding the rollercoaster.

Description

Cyclone was the second machine from Williams, after Comet, depicting an amusement park. The game has no multiball, which is not typical for its era. The final game in the amusement park themed trilogy was Hurricane in 1991.

A revolving mystery wheel is placed in the backbox - ranging from Zilch to 200k, Extra Ball, and Special. A ferris wheel one on the playfield carries the ball for a portion of its rotation.

The playfield features boomerang, comet, spookhouse, and cyclone shots. Images on the moving ferris wheel depict a young couple kiss as it turns. The art on the side of the backbox features an asian type dragon and on the side of cabinet a carnival type design.
 
Sound bites from the game were used in the song "Carousel" by the band Mr. Bungle on their self-titled album.

Digital versions
Cyclone was previously available as a licensed table in The Pinball Arcade. FarSight, the developer of The Pinball Arcade, lost the licenses to all Williams and Bally tables as of June 30, 2018.

See also
Comet - a pinball machine by Williams released in 1985 featuring an amusement park theme
Funhouse - another pinball machine by Williams released in 1990 featuring an amusement park theme

References

External links

Williams pinball machines
1988 pinball machines